This is a list of women artists who were born in Argentina or whose artwork is closely associated with that country.

A
Sofia Achaval de Montaigu (fl 2000s), fashion designer
Eileen Agar (1899–1991), Argentine-born British painter
Elizabeth Aro, contemporary interdisciplinary artist

B

 Fabiana Barreda (born 1967), artist
Eugenia Belin Sarmiento (1860–1952), painter
Claudia Bernardi (born 1955), multimedia artist
Emilia Bertolé (1896–1949), painter and poet
Norma Bessouet (1940–2018), painter
Norah Borges (1901–1998), illustrator and painter
Maitena Burundarena (born 1962), cartoonist
Dina Bursztyn (born 1948), writer and visual artist

C
Delia Cancela (born 1940), fashion designer
Alicia Candiani (born 1953), mixed media
Leonor Cecotto (died 1982), painter, engraver
Jazmín Chebar (born 1973), fashion designer
Fenia Chertkoff (1869–1927), sculptor
Milagros Correch (born 1991), painter, muralist
Alicia Creus (born 1939), visual artist

D
Mirtha Dermisache (1940–2012), asemic writing
Noemí Di Benedetto (1930–2010), painting and sculpture

E

Elizabeth Eichhorn (born 1957), sculptor

F
Rosa Faccaro (1931–2019), painter and educator
Sara Facio (born 1932), photographer
Leonor Fini (1907–1996), painter, illustrator and author
Raquel Forner (1902–1988), expressionist painter
Magda Frank (1914–2010), Hungarian-born sculptor, moved to Argentina

G

Noemí Gerstein (1908–1996), sculptor and illustrator
Sarah Grilo (1919–2007), painter

H

Annemarie Heinrich (1912–2005), photographer
Gaby Herbstein (born 1969), photographer
Ana Maria Hernando (born 1959), visual artist

I
Isabel Iacona (born 1955), painter
Isol (born 1972), illustrator

K
Alexandra Kehayoglou (born 1981), textile artist

L
Agi Lamm (1914–1996), Hungarian-Argentinian illustrator
Adriana Lestido (born 1955), photographer
Cecilia Lueza (born 1971), painter and sculptor
Juana Lumerman (1905–1982), painter
Laura Messing (born 1953), photographer and sculptor

M

Liliana Maresca (1951–1994), sculptor and painter
Rebeca Mendoza (born 1967), abstract painter
Marta Minujín (born 1943), conceptual and performance artist
Lola Mora (1866–1936), sculptor

O
 Marie Orensanz (born 1936), conceptual artist

P
Luna Paiva (born 1980), visual artist
Raquel Partnoy (born 1932), painter
Alicia Penalba (1913–1982), sculptor, tapestry designer and weaver
Amalia Pica (born 1978), multimedia artist
Liliana Porter (born 1941), photographer, printmaker, installation and video artist
Lidy Prati (1921–2008), painter
Naomi Preizler (born 1990), illustrator and photographer
Elena Presser (born 1940), artist
Elisa Pritzker (born 1955), installation artist
Dalila Puzzovio (born 1943), visual artist, fashion designer

R

Josefina Robirosa (1932–2022), painter
Mika Rottenberg (born 1976), video artist

S
Analia Saban (born 1980), illustrator, painter and sculptor
Ana Sacerdote (1925–2019), painter, video and computer artist
Procesa del Carmen Sarmiento (1818–1899), painter
Elsa Serrano (1941–2020), Italian-born Argentine fashion designer
María Simón (1922–2009), sculptor
Meli Valdés Sozzani (born 1977), painter
Grete Stern (1904–1999), photographer

T

Mirta Toledo (born 1952), painter, illustrator and sculptor
Silvia Torras (1936–1970), painter

V

Luciana Val (born 1971), photographer
Meli Valdés Sozzani (born 1977), painter

W
Julia Wernicke (1860–1932), painter and engraver

Y

María Rosa Yorio (born 1954), painter

Z
Pilar Zeta (fl 2009), multimedia artist

See also
List of Argentine artists

References

-
Argentine women artists, List of
Artists
Artists